Cill Na Martra GFC is a Gaelic Athletic Association club based in the parish of Kilnamartyra, Cork, Ireland. The club is a member of the Cork GAA and Muskerry divisional boards. The club fields teams in Gaelic football only, with no hurling played. The club is the home club of Noel O'Leary who won an All-Ireland Senior Football Championship medal with Cork in 2010.

History
Football has been played in the parish of Cill na Martra in the Múscraí Gaeltacht since the foundation of the GAA in 1884 and before.  The first recorded victory of the club occurred in 1887 in a 21 a side match versus the team of Ballinagree.

From then on until the re-establishment of the club in 1978, football had been played on an irregular basis. Since 1978 the club has gone from strength to strength achieving wins Under 12, 13,14,15,16, minor, Under 21, Junior B and Junior A grades.

The club has been playing at the intermediate grade in Cork since 2004.

2012 saw Cill na Martra win the East Region Under 14 and 16 titles in League and Championship. The club's U14s made the County final and our U13s, U12s and Minors all made East Region finals, only to miss out.

In 2012 the Under-16s won the County League and Championship, not losing a game in the process.

Achievements
 Cork Under-21 B Football Championship Winners (1) 2015  Runners-Up 2011
 Cork Minor C Football Championship Runners-Up 2011
 Cork Intermediate Football Championship Winners 2018; Runners-Up 2009
 Cork Junior Football Championship Runners-Up 2003
 Cork Minor C Football Championship Winners (3) 1999, 2004, 2013
 Mid Cork Junior A Football Championship Winners (2) 2002, 2003  Runners-Up 1938, 1958, 1964

Notable players
 Noel O'Leary

References

External sources
Cill na Martra GAA website

Gaelic games clubs in County Cork
Gaelic football clubs in County Cork